Auxesis (aúxēsis) is the Greek word for "growth" or "increase". In rhetoric, it refers to varying forms of increase:

 hyperbole (overstatement): intentionally overstating a point, its importance, or its significance  
 climax (ascending series): a series of clauses of increasing force
 amplificatio (rhetorical increase): extension or exaggerated, needless repetition of arguments to emphasize the point

In ancient Greece, it was also sometimes known as auxanein ("growing").

See also

 Anticlimax, the opposite of auxesis in its climactic sense
 Figure of speech
 Banter
 Meiosis and litotes, the opposite of auxesis in its hyperbolic sense
 Rhetoric
 Trash-talk, insulting language usually found at sporting events
 Fighting words, language to create a verbal/physical confrontation by their use
 Flaming (Internet)
 Flyting, the exchanging of insults
 Hip hop music
 Profanity
 Sledging (cricket)
 Talking shit
 The dozens
 Wolf-whistling

References

Rhetorical techniques